D90 may refer to:
 Nikon D90, 12.3 megapixel DSLR camera
 D 90 road (United Arab Emirates)
 HMS Southampton (D90), a Royal Navy Type 42 destroyer
 HMS Speaker (D90), a Royal Navy escort aircraft carrier
Grünfeld Defence, Encyclopaedia of Chess Openings code
 TDK D90 Cassette